This is a list of electoral results for the electoral district of Sherwood in Queensland state elections.

Members for Sherwood

Election results

Elections in the 1990s

 Preferences were not distributed.

Elections in the 1980s

Elections in the 1970s

|- style="background-color:#E9E9E9"
! colspan="6" style="text-align:left;" |After distribution of preferences

 Preferences were not distributed to completion.

Elections in the 1960s

Elections in the 1950s

References

Queensland state electoral results by district